Remolino is a town and municipality of the Colombian Department of Magdalena. Founded between 1752 and 1776 by Fernando de Mier y Guerra. Erected municipality in 1814.

Politics

Administrative divisions

Corregimientos:  
Corral Viejo
El Dividivi
San Rafael
Santa Rita
El Salado
Martinete
Las Casitas
Buenavista
Candelaria
Rosa Vieja

References

External links
 Remolino official website
 Gobernacion del Magdalena – municipios: Remolino

Municipalities of Magdalena Department